The European Free Trade Association (EFTA) is a regional trade organization and free trade area consisting of four European states: Iceland, Liechtenstein, Norway and Switzerland. The organization operates in parallel with the European Union (EU), and all four member states participate in the European Single Market and are part of the Schengen Area. They are not, however, party to the European Union Customs Union.

EFTA was historically one of the two dominant western European trade blocs, but is now much smaller and closely associated with its historical competitor, the European Union. It was established on 3 May 1960 to serve as an alternative trade bloc for those European states that were unable or unwilling to join the then European Economic Community (EEC), the main predecessor of the EU. The Stockholm Convention (1960), to establish the EFTA, was signed on 4 January 1960 in the Swedish capital by seven countries (known as the "outer seven": Austria, Denmark, Norway, Portugal, Sweden, Switzerland and the United Kingdom). A revised Convention, the Vaduz Convention, was signed on 21 June 2001 and entered into force on 1 June 2002.

Since 1995, only two founding members remain, namely Norway and Switzerland. The other five, Austria, Denmark, Portugal, Sweden and the United Kingdom, had joined the EU at some point in the intervening years. The initial Stockholm Convention was superseded by the Vaduz Convention, which aimed to provide a successful framework for continuing the expansion and liberalization of trade, both among the organization's member states and with the rest of the world.

Whilst the EFTA is not a customs union and member states have full rights to enter into bilateral third-country trade arrangements, it does have a coordinated trade policy. As a result, its member states have jointly concluded free trade agreements with the EU and a number of other countries. To participate in the EU's single market, Iceland, Liechtenstein, and Norway are parties to the Agreement on a European Economic Area (EEA), with compliances regulated by the EFTA Surveillance Authority and the EFTA Court. Switzerland has a set of bilateral agreements with the EU instead.

Membership

History

On 12 January 1960, the Treaty on the European Free Trade Association was initiated in the Golden Hall of the Stockholm City Hall. This established the progressive elimination of customs duties on industrial products, but did not affect agricultural or fisheries products.

The main difference between the early EEC and the EFTA was that the latter did not operate common external customs tariffs unlike the former: each EFTA member was free to establish its individual customs duties against, or its individual free trade agreements with, non-EFTA countries.

The founding members of the EFTA were: Austria, Denmark, Norway, Portugal, Sweden, Switzerland and the United Kingdom. During the 1960s, these countries were often referred to as the "Outer Seven", as opposed to the Inner Six of the then European Economic Community (EEC).

Finland became an associate member in 1961 and a full member in 1986, and Iceland joined in 1970. The United Kingdom and Denmark joined the EEC in 1973 and hence ceased to be EFTA members. Portugal also left EFTA for the European Community in 1986. Liechtenstein joined the EFTA in 1991 (previously its interests had been represented by Switzerland). Austria, Sweden, and Finland joined the EU in 1995 and thus ceased to be EFTA members.

Twice, in 1972 and in 1994, the Norwegian government had tried to join the EU (still the EEC, in 1973) and by doing so, leave the EFTA. However, both the times, the membership of the EU was rejected in national referendums, keeping Norway in the EFTA. Iceland applied for EU membership in 2009 due to the 2008–2011 Icelandic financial crisis, but has since dropped its bid.

Current members

Former members

Other negotiations

Between 1994 and 2011, EFTA memberships for Andorra, San Marino, Monaco, the Isle of Man, Turkey, Israel, Morocco, and other European Neighbourhood Policy partners were discussed.

Andorra, Monaco, and San Marino
In November 2012, after the Council of the European Union had called for an evaluation of the EU's relations with Andorra, Monaco, and San Marino, which they described as "fragmented", the European Commission published a report outlining the options for their further integration into the EU. Unlike Liechtenstein, which is a member of the EEA via the EFTA and the Schengen Agreement, relations with these three states are based on a collection of agreements covering specific issues. The report examined four alternatives to the current situation: 
 A Sectoral Approach with separate agreements with each state covering an entire policy area. 
 A comprehensive, multilateral Framework Association Agreement (FAA) with the three states. 
 EEA membership, and 
 EU membership. 
However, the Commission argued that the sectoral approach did not address the major issues and was still needlessly complicated, while EU membership was dismissed in the near future because "the EU institutions are currently not adapted to the accession of such small-sized countries". The remaining options, EEA membership and a FAA with the states, were found to be viable and were recommended by the commission. In response, the Council requested that negotiations with the three microstates on further integration continue, and that a report be prepared by the end of 2013 detailing the implications of the two viable alternatives and recommendations on how to proceed.

As EEA membership is currently only open to EFTA or EU member states, the consent of existing EFTA member states is required for the microstates to join the EEA without becoming members of the EU. In 2011, Jonas Gahr Støre, then Foreign Minister of Norway which is an EFTA member state, said that EFTA/EEA membership for the microstates was not the appropriate mechanism for their integration into the internal market due to their different requirements from those of larger countries such as Norway, and suggested that a simplified association would be better suited for them. Espen Barth Eide, Støre's successor, responded to the commission's report in late 2012 by questioning whether the microstates have sufficient administrative capabilities to meet the obligations of EEA membership. However, he stated that Norway would be open to the possibility of EFTA membership for the microstates if they decided to submit an application, and that the country had not made a final decision on the matter. Pascal Schafhauser, the Counsellor of the Liechtenstein Mission to the EU, said that Liechtenstein, another EFTA member state, was willing to discuss EEA membership for the microstates provided their joining did not impede the functioning of the organization. However, he suggested that the option of direct membership in the EEA for the microstates, outside of both the EFTA and the EU, should be considered. On 18 November 2013, the EU Commission concluded that "the participation of the small-sized countries in the EEA is not judged to be a viable option at present due to the political and institutional reasons", and that Association Agreements were a more feasible mechanism to integrate the microstates into the internal market.

Norway
The Norwegian electorate had rejected treaties of accession to the EU in two referendums. At the time of the first referendum in 1972, their neighbour, Denmark joined. Since the second referendum in 1994, two other Nordic neighbours, Sweden and Finland, have joined the EU. The last two governments of Norway have not advanced the question, as they have both been coalition governments consisting of proponents and opponents of EU membership.

Switzerland
Since Switzerland rejected the EEA membership in a referendum in 1992, more referendums on EU membership have been initiated, the last time being in 2001. These were all rejected. Switzerland has been in a customs union with fellow EFTA member state and neighbour Liechtenstein since 1924.

Iceland

On 16 July 2009, the government of Iceland formally applied for EU membership, but the negotiation process was suspended in mid-2013, and in 2015 the foreign ministers wrote to withdraw its application.

Faroes and Greenland (Kingdom of Denmark)

Denmark was a founding member of EFTA in 1960, but its membership ended in 1973, when it joined the European Communities. Greenland was covered by Denmark's EFTA membership from 1961 and the Faroe Islands from 1968. Since then, the Faroe Islands have examined the possibility of membership of EFTA. In Greenland there has been a political debate about whether the Government of Greenland consider filing for membership of the EFTA. However, membership of the EFTA is not possible without the Kingdom of Denmark as a state becoming a member of the organization on behalf of the Faroe Islands and/or Greenland. EFTA assumes that membership is reserved for states. Special procedures for the accession of states are laid down in accordance with Article 56 of the EFTA Convention. The Kingdom of Denmark's membership of EFTA is reserved for the Kingdom of Denmark under international law. As parts of the Kingdom of Denmark, the Faroe Islands and Greenland cannot, with the current treaty basis, become independent members of the EFTA.

In the event of regaining membership of EFTA for the Kingdom of Denmark it can be arranged to take effect for only the Faroe Islands and/or Greenland. EFTA membership would be geographically separated from EU membership(which is limited to Denmark). It is possible to assume that membership of the EU with effect for Denmark does not preclude membership of the EFTA with effect for the Faroe Islands and/or Greenland. This form of membership of the EFTA appears to be possible in accordance with the EFTA treaty.

In mid-2005, representatives of the Faroe Islands raised the possibility of their territory joining the EFTA. According to Article 56 of the EFTA Convention, only states may become members of the EFTA. The Faroes are an autonomous territory of the Kingdom of Denmark, and not a sovereign state in their own right. Consequently, they considered the possibility that the "Kingdom of Denmark in respect of the Faroes" could join the EFTA, though the Danish Government has stated that this mechanism would not allow the Faroes to become a separate member of the EEA because Denmark was already a party to the EEA Agreement.

The Government of Denmark officially supports membership of the EFTA with effect for the Faroe Islands.

The Faroes already have an extensive bilateral free trade agreement with Iceland, known as the Hoyvík Agreement.

United Kingdom

The United Kingdom was a co-founder of EFTA in 1960, but ceased to be a member upon joining the European Economic Community. The country held a referendum in 2016 on withdrawing from the EU (popularly referred to as "Brexit"), resulting in a 51.9% vote in favour of withdrawing. A 2013 research paper presented to the Parliament of the United Kingdom proposed a number of alternatives to EU membership which would continue to allow it access to the EU's internal market, including continuing EEA membership as an EFTA member state, or the Swiss model of a number of bilateral treaties covering the provisions of the single market.

In the first meeting since the Brexit vote, EFTA reacted by saying both that they were open to a UK return, and that Britain has many issues to work through. The president of Switzerland Johann Schneider-Ammann stated that its return would strengthen the association. However, in August 2016 the Norwegian Government expressed reservations. Norway's European affairs minister, Elisabeth Vik Aspaker, told the Aftenposten newspaper: "It's not certain that it would be a good idea to let a big country into this organization. It would shift the balance, which is not necessarily in Norway's interests."

In late 2016, the Scottish First Minister said that her priority was to keep the whole of the UK in the European single market but that taking Scotland alone into the EEA was an option being "looked at". However, other EFTA states have stated that only sovereign states are eligible for membership, so it could only join if it became independent from the UK, unless the solution scouted for the Faroes in 2005 were to be adopted (see above).

In early 2018, British MPs Antoinette Sandbach, Stephen Kinnock and Stephen Hammond all called for the UK to rejoin EFTA.

Relationship with the European Union: the European Economic Area

In 1992, the EU, its member states, and the EFTA member states signed the Agreement on the European Economic Area in Oporto, Portugal. However, the proposal that Switzerland ratify its participation was rejected by referendum. (Nevertheless, Switzerland has multiple bilateral treaties with the EU that allow it to participate in the European Single Market, the Schengen Agreement and other programmes). Thus, except for Switzerland, the EFTA members are also members of the European Economic Area (EEA). The EEA comprises three member states of the European Free Trade Association (EFTA) and 27 member states of the European Union (EU), including Croatia which the agreement is provisionally applied to, pending its ratification by all contracting parties. It was established on 1 January 1994 following an agreement with the European Community (which had become the EU two months earlier). It allows the EFTA-EEA states to participate in the EU's Internal Market without being members of the EU. They adopt almost all EU legislation related to the single market, except laws on agriculture and fisheries. However, they also contribute to and influence the formation of new EEA relevant policies and legislation at an early stage as part of a formal decision-shaping process. One EFTA member, Switzerland, has not joined the EEA but has a series of bilateral agreements, including a free trade agreement, with the EU.

The following table summarises the various components of EU laws applied in the EFTA countries and their sovereign territories. Some territories of EU member states also have a special status in regard to EU laws applied as is the case with some European microstates.

EEA institutions
A Joint Committee consisting of the EEA-EFTA States plus the European Commission (representing the EU) has the function of extending relevant EU law to the non EU members. An EEA Council meets twice yearly to govern the overall relationship between the EEA members.

Rather than setting up pan-EEA institutions, the activities of the EEA are regulated by the EFTA Surveillance Authority and the EFTA Court. The EFTA Surveillance Authority and the EFTA Court regulate the activities of the EFTA members in respect of their obligations in the European Economic Area (EEA). Since Switzerland is not an EEA member, it does not participate in these institutions.

The EFTA Surveillance Authority performs a role for EFTA members that is equivalent to that of the European Commission for the EU, as "guardian of the treaties" and the EFTA Court performs the European Court of Justice-equivalent role.

The original plan for the EEA lacked the EFTA Court or the EFTA Surveillance Authority: the European Court of Justice and the European Commission were to exercise those roles. However, during the negotiations for the EEA agreement, the European Court of Justice informed the Council of the European Union by way of letter that it considered that it would be a violation of the treaties to give to the EU institutions these powers with respect to non-EU member states. Therefore, the current arrangement was developed instead.

EEA and Norway Grants
The EEA and Norway Grants are the financial contributions of Iceland, Liechtenstein and Norway to reduce social and economic disparities in Europe. They were established in conjunction with the 2004 enlargement of the European Economic Area (EEA), which brought together the EU, Iceland, Liechtenstein and Norway in the Internal Market. In the period from 2004 to 2009, €1.3 billion of project funding was made available for project funding in the 15 beneficiary states in Central and Southern Europe. The EEA and Norway Grants are administered by the Financial Mechanism Office, which is affiliated to the EFTA Secretariat in Brussels.

International conventions
EFTA also originated the Hallmarking Convention and the Pharmaceutical Inspection Convention, both of which are open to non-EFTA states.

International trade relations

EFTA has 29 free trade agreements with non-EU countries as well as declarations on cooperation and joint workgroups to improve trade. Currently, the EFTA States have established preferential trade relations with 40 states and territories, in addition to the 27 member states of the European Union.

EFTA's interactive Free Trade Map gives an overview of the partners worldwide.

Free trade agreements
 Albania
 Bosnia and Herzegovina
 Canada (Canada-European Free Trade Association Free Trade Agreement)
 Central American States (Costa Rica, Guatemala, Panama)
 Chile
 Colombia
 Ecuador
 Egypt
 Georgia
 Gulf Co-operation Council (Bahrain, Kuwait, Oman, Qatar, Saudi Arabia, United Arab Emirates)

 Hong Kong
 Indonesia 
 Israel
 Jordan
 South Korea
 Lebanon
 Mexico
 Montenegro
 Morocco (excluding Western Sahara)
 North Macedonia
 Palestinian National Authority
 Peru
 Philippines
 Serbia
 Singapore
 Southern African Customs Union (Botswana, Eswatini, Lesotho, Namibia, South Africa)
 Tunisia
 Turkey
 Ukraine

Ongoing free trade negotiations

 Algeria (Negotiations currently on hold)
 Central American States (Honduras) (Negotiations currently on hold)
 India
 Malaysia
 MERCOSUR (Argentina, Brazil, Paraguay Uruguay and Venezuela)
  (Negotiations currently on hold)
 Thailand
 Vietnam
 Kosovo
 Moldova

Declarations on cooperation or dialogue on closer trade relations

 Mauritius
 MERCOSUR (Argentina, Brazil, Paraguay and Uruguay)
 Mongolia
 Myanmar
 Pakistan

Travel policies

Free movement of people within EFTA and the EU/EEA

EFTA member states' citizens enjoy freedom of movement in each other's territories in accordance with the EFTA convention. EFTA nationals also enjoy freedom of movement in the European Union (EU). EFTA nationals and EU citizens are not only visa-exempt but are legally entitled to enter and reside in each other's countries. The Citizens' Rights Directive (also sometimes called the "Free Movement Directive") defines the right of free movement for citizens of the European Economic Area (EEA), which includes the three EFTA members Iceland, Norway and Liechtenstein plus the member states of the EU. Switzerland, which is a member of EFTA but not of the EEA, is not bound by the Directive but rather has a separate bilateral agreement on free movement with the EU.

As a result, a citizen of an EFTA country can live and work in all the other EFTA countries and in all the EU countries, and a citizen of an EU country can live and work in all the EFTA countries (but for voting and working in sensitive fields, such as government / police / military, citizenship is often required, and non-citizens may not have the same rights to welfare and unemployment benefits as citizens).

General secretaries

Portugal Fund
The Portugal Fund came into operation in February 1977 when Portugal was still a member of EFTA. It was to provide funding for the development of Portugal after the Carnation Revolution and the consequential restoration of democracy and the decolonization of the country's overseas possessions. This followed a period of economic sanctions by most of the international community, which left Portugal economically underdeveloped compared to the rest of the western Europe. When Portugal left EFTA in 1985 in order to join the EEC, the remaining EFTA members decided to continue the Portugal Fund so that Portugal would continue to benefit from it. The Fund originally took the form of a low-interest loan from the EFTA member states to the value of US$100 million. Repayment was originally to commence in 1988, however, EFTA then decided to postpone the start of repayments until 1998. The Portugal Fund was dissolved in January 2002.

See also
 Central European Free Trade Agreement 
 Euro-Mediterranean free trade area 
 European Union Association Agreement
 European Union free trade agreements
 Free trade areas in Europe

Notes

References

External links

Official website
Collection of acts adopted by the EFTA and published in the Official Journal (the OJEU)

 
European Economic Area
1960 establishments in Europe
Free-trade areas
Intergovernmental organizations established by treaty
Liechtenstein–Switzerland relations
Organisations based in Geneva
Organizations established in 1960
Trade blocs